Sohan de Livera (born 17 August 2000) is a Sri Lankan cricketer. He made his first-class debut on 31 January 2020, for Sinhalese Sports Club in the 2019–20 Premier League Tournament. He made his Twenty20 debut on 4 March 2021, for Sinhalese Sports Club in the 2020–21 SLC Twenty20 Tournament. Sinhalese Sports Club went on to win the tournament for the first time since 2005. He made his List A debut on 31 October 2021, for Moors Sports Club in the 2021–22 Major Clubs Limited Over Tournament.

References

External links
 

2000 births
Living people
Sri Lankan cricketers
Moors Sports Club cricketers
Sinhalese Sports Club cricketers
Place of birth missing (living people)